Garbagna is a comune (municipality) in the Province of Alessandria in the Italian region Piedmont, located about  southeast of Turin and about  southeast of Alessandria.

Garbagna borders the following municipalities: Avolasca, Borghetto di Borbera, Brignano-Frascata, Casasco, Castellania Coppi, Dernice, and Sardigliano.

References

Cities and towns in Piedmont